

Men

Men's Open

Men's 40+

Men's 45+

Men's 50+

Men's 55+

Men's 60+

Men's 65+

Men's 70+

Men's 75+

Men's 80+

Women

Women's Open

Women's 40+

Women's 50+

Mixed

Mixed Open

Mixed 40+

Mixed 50+

Mixed Junior u13

Mixed Junior u15

Mixed Junior u17

Mixed Junior u19

Junior Boys

Junior Girls

Century Doubles

Intercollegiate

Men's

Women's

Mixed

Records

Most Overall Titles by University

Mixed

Father/son

Siblings

See also
U.S. SQUASH
Squash Doubles
United States Open (squash)
US Junior Open squash championship
Men's National Champions (Squash)
Women's National Champions (Squash)

Squash in the United States
Squash tournaments in the United States